The 2022 Men's FIH Hockey Nations Cup was the first edition of the Men's FIH Hockey Nations Cup, the annual qualification tournament for the Men's FIH Pro League organised by the International Hockey Federation. The tournament was held at the NWU Astro in Potchefstroom, South Africa from 28 November to 4 December 2022.

South Africa, as the winner, was promoted to the 2023–24 Men's FIH Pro League.

Teams
The eight highest ranked teams not participating in the Men's FIH Pro League participated in the tournament:

Preliminary round
All times are local (UTC+2).

Pool A

Pool B

Classification round

Bracket

5–8th place semifinals

Seventh and eighth place

Fifth and sixth place

Final round

Bracket

Semi-finals

Third and fourth place

Final

Goalscorers

Final standing

Awards
The awards were announced on 4 December 2022.

See also
 2022 Women's FIH Hockey Nations Cup
 2022–23 Men's FIH Pro League

References

Men's FIH Hockey Nations Cup
Nations Cup
FIH Hockey Nations Cup
International field hockey competitions hosted by South Africa
FIH Hockey Nations Cup
FIH Hockey Nations Cup
Sport in North West (South African province)
Potchefstroom